Charlotte Reeve Conover (June 14, 1855 – September 23, 1940) was an American author, lecturer, political activist, educator, and  "Dayton's historian".

Early life and education
Conover was born to physician Dr. John Charles and Emma Barlow Reeve on June 14, 1855. She attended Dayton Central High School, Cooper Seminary, and the University of Geneva.

Writing career
Conover wrote books about Dayton history and articles for Ladies' Home Journal, Harper's and The Atlantic. She wrote a regular column called "Mrs. Conover's Corner" for the Dayton Daily News and served as editor of the Women's Page for four years. Her four-volume history Dayton and Montgomery County was in 1965 considered "the most authentic public record of Dayton and its pioneer citizens." She was noted for her "pioneering studies" of area history.

In her later years she lost her eyesight but continued to write columns for the Dayton Daily News; friends visited to help her read, and the paper's owner and editor, Governor Cox, never knew that she was blind.

Impact
In 1901, Conover martialled the Young Women's League of Dayton to take over the publication of the Dayton Daily News – known as "The Day The Women Got Out The News" – on March 30, 1901, as a fundraiser for the organization. 
Conover was a leader of the Woman's Suffrage Party of Montgomery County. In The Importance for Women to have Suffrage: An Address before the Woman Suffrage Association she spoke of the importance of suffrage and equality of the sexes to the country's future. 
Conover was a founder of the Dayton Woman's Literary Club and served as its fourth president, from 1895 to 1897. She encouraged other writers, among them fellow Daytonian Paul Laurence Dunbar.

In 1932, one of her lectures, Ramblings of an Ancient Daytonian, was reprinted in its entirety in the Dayton Daily News.

The Dayton Daily News in 1940 called her "Dayton's foremost historian." This obituary appeared on the front pages of the Dayton Daily News and the Dayton Herald, and on the editorial page of the Dayton Journal. NCR chairman of the board E. A. Deeds called her "perhaps Dayton's most outstanding citizen."

Personal life
Conover married lawyer Frank K. Conover on October 14, 1879. They had four children, Elizabeth Dickson, John Charles Reeve, Wilbur Dickson, and Charlotte Mary.

Awards and honors
Conover was inducted into the Dayton Walk of Fame in 2007. Paul Laurence Dunbar dedicated his Lyrics of Sunshine and Shadow to her. She is listed in Woman's Who's Who of America 1914–1915.

Bibliography
 Some Dayton Saints and Prophets
 Concerning the Forefathers: Being A Memoir, with personal narrative and letters of two pioneers Col. Robert Patterson and Col. John Johnston (1903)
 Recollections of Sixty Years By John Johnston, Indian Agent for the US Government (1915, with John Johnston)
 Memoirs of the Miami Valley (1919)
 Dayton: An Intimate History
 Dayton and Montgomery County (1932)
 Builders in New Fields (1939)
 David Gebhart, Alpha 1827 - Omega 1907: A Memory and an Appreciation
 On Being Eighty and Other Digressions 
 A History of the Beck Family
 The Patterson Log Cabin
 The Story of Dayton
 Harvest of Years: Four sprightly essays

References

Journalists from Ohio
American women journalists
American columnists
American women columnists
Educators from Ohio
American women educators
20th-century American journalists
20th-century American women writers
Writers from Dayton, Ohio
1855 births
1940 deaths
19th-century American women writers
American women historians
19th-century American historians
20th-century American historians
Burials at Woodland Cemetery and Arboretum
University of Geneva alumni
Women's page journalists
Blind writers
Blind academics
Historians from Ohio